Dryodoridae is a family of ctenophores belonging to the order Cydippida. The family consists of only one genus: Dryodora Agassiz, 1860.

References

Tentaculata